The 2012 Algerian Cup Final was final of the 48th edition of the Algerian Cup. The game was held on May 1st, 2012 at the Stade 5 Juillet 1962 in Algiers between CR Belouizdad and ES Sétif.

ES Sétif won the game 2–1 in extra-time with a goal from Mokhtar Benmoussa in the 96th minute.

FIFA president Sepp Blatter and CAF president Issa Hayatou were both there in attendance.

Background
Prior to the 2012 final, ES Sétif had reached the final of the Algerian Cup seven times, winning all seven. The last time they reached the final was in 2010, where they beat CA Batna 3–0. On the other hand, CR Belouizdad had reached the final of the Algerian Cup eight times, winning six of them. The last time they reached the final was in 2009, where they beat CA Bordj Bou Arreridj 2–1 in the penalty shoot-out. Despite reaching the final a combined 15 times prior to the 2012 edition, the two teams had never met previously in the final. 

During the season, the two teams met twice prior to the Algerian Cup final, with each team winning one game. In the first game, ES Sétif won 3–1 in Algiers. In the second match, CR Belouizdad beat ES Sétif 2–0 in Sétif.

Match details

References

Algerian Cup
Algerian Cup Finals
ES Sétif matches